Pseudomelatomidae is a family of predatory sea snails, marine gastropods included in the superfamily Conoidea (previously Conacea) and part of the Neogastropoda (Bouchet & Rocroi, 2005).

In 1995 Kantor elevated the subfamily Pseudomelatominae to the status of family Pseudomelatomidae. 

In 2011 Bouchet, Kantor et al. moved the Crassispirinae and Zonulispirinae and numerous genera of snails loosely called turrid snails (which at that point had been placed in the family Conidae) and placed them in the family Pseudomelatomidae.  This was based on a cladistical analysis of shell morphology, radular characteristics, anatomical characters, and a dataset of molecular sequences of three gene fragments.

Genera 
Genera within the family Pseudomelatomidae include:

 Abyssocomitas Sysoev & Kantor, 1986
 Aguilaria Taylor & Wells, 1994
 Anticomitas Powell, 1942
 Antimelatoma Powell, 1942
 Antiplanes Dall, 1902
 Benthodaphne Oyama, 1962
 † Boreocomitas Hickman, 1976 
 Brachytoma Swainson, 1840
 Burchia Bartsch, 1944
 Buridrillia Olsson, 1942
 Calcatodrillia Kilburn, 1988
 Carinodrillia Dall, 1919
 Carinoturris Bartsch, 1944
 Cheungbeia Taylor & Wells, 1994
 † Clavatoma Powell, 1942
 Cleospira McLean, 1971
 Comitas Finlay, 1926
 Compsodrillia Woodring, 1928
 Conorbela Powell, 1951
 Conticosta Laseron, 1954
 Crassiclava McLean, 1971
 Crassispira Swainson, 1840
 Cretaspira Kuroda & Oyama, 1971
 Dallspira Bartsch, 1950
 Doxospira McLean, 1971
 Funa Kilburn, 1988
 Gibbaspira McLean, 1971
 Glossispira McLean, 1971
 Hindsiclava Hertlein & A.M. Strong, 1955
 Hormospira Berry, 1958
 Inquisitor Hedley, 1918
 Knefastia Dall, 1919
 Kurilohadalia Sysoev & Kantor, 1986
 Kurodadrillia Azuma, 1975
 Leucosyrinx Dall, 1889
 Lioglyphostoma Woodring, 1928
 Maesiella McLean, 1971
 Mammillaedrillia Kuroda & Oyama, 1971
 Megasurcula Casey, 1904
 Meggittia Ray, 1977
 Miraclathurella Woodring, 1928
 Monilispira Bartsch & Rehder, 1939
 Naudedrillia Kilburn, 1988
 Nymphispira McLean, 1971
 Otitoma Jousseaume, 1898
 Paracomitas Powell, 1942
 Pilsbryspira Bartsch, 1950
 Plicisyrinx Sysoev & Kantor, 1986
 Pseudomelatoma Dall, 1918
 Pseudotaranis McLean, 1995
 Ptychobela Thiele, 1925
 Pyrgospira McLean, 1971
 Rhodopetoma Bartsch, 1944
 Sediliopsis Petuch, 1988
 Shutonia van der Bijl, 1993
 Strictispira McLean, 1971
 Striospira Bartsch, 1950
 Thelecythara Woodring, 1928
 Tiariturris Berry, 1958
 Viridrillia Bartsch, 1943
 Zonulispira Bartsch, 1950

Genera brought into synonymy 
 Epidirona Iredale, 1931: synonym of Epideira Hedley, 1918
 Lioglyphostomella Shuto, 1970: synonym of Otitoma Jousseaume, 1898
 Macrosinus Beu, 1970: synonym of Paracomitas Powell, 1942
 Rectiplanes Bartsch, 1944: synonym of Antiplanes Dall, 1902
 Rectisulcus Habe, 1958: synonym of Antiplanes Dall, 1902
 Schepmania Shuto, 1970: synonym of Shutonia van der Bijl, 1993
 Thelecytharella Shuto, 1969: synonym of Otitoma Jousseaume, 1898
 Turrigemma Berry, 1958: synonym of Hindsiclava Hertlein & A.M. Strong, 1955
 Viridrillina Bartsch, 1943: synonym of Viridrillia Bartsch, 1943

Genera moved to another family 
 Austrocarina Laseron, 1954 has been moved to the family Horaiclavidae.

References

 (Pseudomelatominae) The American Malacological Union. Annual Reports for 1965: 2

External links
 
 Worldwide Mollusc Species Data Base: Pseudomelatomidae
 James Mc Lean, A revised classification of the family Turridae , with the proposal of new subfamilies, genera, and subgenera from the Eastern Pacific - General description of the subfamily Zonulispirinae, now recognized as the family Pseudomelatomidae; The Veliger v. 14 (1971-1972)

 
Gastropod families